Vătafu may refer to:

Ştefania Vătafu (born 1993), Romanian footballer
Vătafu River, river in Romania